Goran Bogdan (born 2 October 1980) is a Croatian actor. He has appeared in more than 40 films since 2005.

He has appeared in some American and English films and TV series such as the 2012 film Goltzius and the Pelican Company, and the third season of the television series Fargo.

He starred in the 2015 TV series The Last Panthers, alongside Samantha Morton and John Hurt.

Early life
Goran Bogdan was born 2 October 1980 in Lištica (today Široki Brijeg) to Croatian parents. He finished at Faculty of Economics and Business at University of Zagreb, then he started his acting career in The Zagreb Youth Theater. He currently resides in Zagreb, Croatia.

In 2013, he was named the theatre actor of the year by the Teatar.hr Awards. For his role in the Branko Schmidt film Agape, he won the 2017 Vladimir Nazor Award for excellence in film. His role in the 2020 film Otac earned him universal acclaim and made history by becoming the first Croatian actor nominated at the European Film Awards for Best Actor.

He provided the voice of McBunny in the Croatian-language version of Garfield 2.

Filmography

Film

Television

References

External links 

1980 births
Living people
People from Široki Brijeg
Croats of Bosnia and Herzegovina
Croatian male film actors